The 1890 Chicago Pirates baseball team was a member of the short lived Players' League. They compiled a 75–62 record, good for fourth place, ten games behind the league champion Boston Reds. After the season, the league folded, and the Pirates were bought out by the Chicago Colts.

Regular season

Season standings

Record vs. opponents

Roster

Player stats

Batting

Starters by position 
Note: Pos = Position; G = Games played; AB = At bats; H = Hits; Avg. = Batting average; HR = Home runs; RBI = Runs batted in

Other batters 
Note: G = Games played; AB = At bats; H = Hits; Avg. = Batting average; HR = Home runs; RBI = Runs batted in

Pitching

Starting pitchers 
Note: G = Games pitched; IP = Innings pitched; W = Wins; L = Losses; ERA = Earned run average; SO = Strikeouts

Other pitchers 
Note: G = Games pitched; IP = Innings pitched; W = Wins; L = Losses; ERA = Earned run average; SO = Strikeouts

References 
 1890 Chicago Pirates team page at Baseball Reference

Chicago Pirates season
Chicago Pirates
Chicago Pirates